Fedorkovo is a rural locality (a village) in Yaganovskoye Rural Settlement, Cherepovetsky District, Vologda Oblast, Russia. The population was 13 as of 2002 census

Geography 
Beketovo is the nearest rural locality.

References 

Rural localities in Cherepovetsky District